Maharaj Ki Jai Ho! (Hail the King!) is an Indian television science fiction sitcom series that ran from 23 March 2020 to 20 May 2020 on Star Plus, later shifted to Star Utsav and streams on digital platform Disney+ Hotstar. It starred Satyajeet Dubey in the main lead role of Sanjay. The telecast of the show was hampered due to its low ratings during COVID-19 pandemic and the show had to decline without completing its story in May 2020.

Plot
Sanjay, a small-time pickpocket hailing from Delhi travels back in time via a portal accidentally opened by the time machine of scientist Dr. Albert D'Souza to the period of Mahabharat during Dhritarashtra's reign in Hastinapur and causes chaos in the region. Sanjay crosses path with Sunaina, a thief (later revealed to be the Princess of Suryagarh) where love blossoms. The journey follows comedy and romance taking place in his life there and his eventual escape.

Cast
 Satyajeet Dubey as Sanjay Arora: A petty con-man from Delhi
Ashwin Mushran as Dr. Albert D'Souza: Scientist who creates the time machine
 Riya Sharma as Sunaina: Suryabhan's Daughter
Nitesh Pandey as Dhritarashtra: The king of Hastinapur
 Aakash Dabhade as Shakuni
 Rajesh Kumar as King Suryabhan: The enemy of King Dhritarashtra
 Monica Castelino as Gandhari: Dhritarashtra's wife; The queen of Hastinapur
 Abhishek Avasthi as Dhritarashtra's Senapati
 Sumit Arora as Suryabhan's Senapati 
 Wahib Kapadia as Pratap a.k.a. Pappu: Suryabhan's son
 Vaishnavi Rao as Padma, Sunaina's friend
 Sulakshana Khatri as Mandakini
 Maera Mishra as Sweety

Production

Development
The first promo of the series was released on 19 March 2020.

After the end of Kahaan Hum Kahaan Tum, Anupamaa was supposed to take the slot from 16 March 2020. Due to the outbreak of COVID-19, as the shootings were stalled, its launch was pushed due to inadequate bank episodes and Maharaj ki Jai Ho! got the slot to premiere on 23 March 2020 as there was a bank of about 50 episodes.

Casting
Satyajeet Dubey was cast as the main lead Sanjay, returning to television after nine years. Speaking about his role, he said, "I play Sanjay in Maharaj Ki Jai Ho, which is a situational comedy. My character is that of a rangeela, street-smart punter. Somehow, he goes back in time by 5,000 years and that's what piqued my interest." Besides Ashwin Mushran, Nitesh Pandey, Aakash Dabhade, Rajesh Kumar, Clair  Castelino, Riya Sharma and Abhishek Awasthy were cast.

References

External links 
 

StarPlus original programming
Hindi-language television shows
Indian drama television series
Indian science fiction television series
2020 Indian television series debuts
Hindu mythology in popular culture